Central High School is a public high school located in Cape Girardeau, Missouri, United States. It is in the Cape Girardeau School District.

The district, and therefore the high school's attendance boundary, includes the vast majority of Cape Girardeau, as well as the majority of Dutchtown and small sections of Jackson and Scott City.

Campus
Central High moved from its old building (now Central Junior High School) to the newly constructed one in 2002. The campus has a variety of athletic facilities on-site, including a tennis court, a full track, along with baseball, softball, soccer, and marching band practice fields. There is a brand new 5 seat stadium that was recently added and a new performing arts building, Kinder Hall. The main building is divided into two wings, one of which houses the academic classrooms on two levels; and the other is an athletic/music wing with two gymnasiums, a weight room, wrestling room, and a band practice room. A full library is centrally located, indoor courtyard-style, in the academic wing of the building.

Academics
Central operates on a daily schedule based around seven class periods. School starts at 7:35 AM and ends at 2:40 PM.

Up until 2006, students had to complete a minimum of 23 Carnegie units to graduate from Central; but beginning with the freshman class of 20062007 the minimum was raised to 24.

The current minimum requirements for graduation include: four units of communication arts, three units of mathematics, and three units of science, including conceptual physics during grade nine and biology during grade eleven. Three units of social studies courses are required; including one unit of world history, one unit of American history, and one half-unit each of national and state government. Two units of physical education are required, with one unit of ninth grade PE and one-half unit of tenth grade PE. An additional half-unit PE elective is required during the eleventh or twelfth grade. One half-unit of health during the tenth grade year is mandatory. One half-unit of consumer education, finance management, or business law is required during senior year. One unit each of fine arts and practical arts along with six units of other electives bring the total to twenty-four units.

The school offers a wide variety of subjects, especially for upperclassmen, as well as full-time special education.

Academic honors
Cape Central High School was recognized in May 2007 by ACT as one of 382 schools in America (one of eight in Missouri) for academic rigor in mathematics and science. Cape Central has also been commended for its Advisory class, which helps many students.

Notable alumni
Kathryn Swan, member of the Missouri House of Representatives
 Rush Limbaugh, Conservative Radio Talk Show Host

References

External links

Cape Girardeau Public Schools

High schools in Cape Girardeau County, Missouri
Buildings and structures in Cape Girardeau, Missouri
Public high schools in Missouri